Lionel Cruet (born in San Juan, Puerto Rico) is an audiovisual and geopolitical artist whose work is focused on intimate relationships with the environment.

Early life and education 
Lionel Cruet was born in 1989 in San Juan, Puerto Rico. He received a Bachelor in Fine Arts from La Escuela de Artes Plásticas Puerto Rico and a Master in Fine Arts from The City College of New York, and a Masters in Education from the College of Saint Rose.

Career and art 
Lionel Cruet’s artworks expresses ideas of nature and its threats due to global warming, pollution, climate change and colonization. His art got scholarly acknowledgment as it addresses hurricanes and the environment globally and in Puerto Rico Other scholarly acknowledgment include the aspects of patterns in art. 

He exhibited his first individual exhibition in Puerto Rico "Lionel Cruet: Rhetoric of an uncertain future"

Through drawings and animations of sea turtles, sea crabs, the artist depicts a transmedia ecosystem of creatures. A key component of the artist's approach to the natural environment is the use of digital media video projections and sound. 

Previous exhibitions include Lionel Cruet: In Between, Real and Digital at the Bronx River Art Center where traditional elements like unfinished canvas are merged with video projections that depict water and other natural occurrences in Cruet's interactive installations. Interactions between the actual world and the virtual world exceed their respective borders. Between and within at the EFA Project Space Program,  Eco Urgency: Now or Never, Wave Hill  and  Seen and Heard, Everson Museum of Art, Syracuse New York.

Awards and recognition 
Following are a few notable awards and recognition to mention. 

 Juan Downey Audiovisual Award winner
 Received fellowship for the Socrates Sculpture Park in New York City
 Selected as fellow of The Laundromat Project
 US Latinx Art Forum, grant recipient
 Selected as participant at ICA Institute of Contemporary Art Miami

References

External links 

 Official website 
 Instagram

Puerto Rican artists
Latin American artists
1989 births
Living people